The yardmaster is the railroad employee in charge of the rail yard. They manage and coordinate all activities in combining rolling stocks into trains, and breaking down trains into individual railroad cars, and switching trains from track-to-track in the rail yard. In the United States of America, yardmasters are eligible to join the Railroad Yardmasters of America.

Notable former yardmasters in the U.S.
John Walker Barriger III (1899–1976) assistant yardmaster at the Pennsylvania Railroad
George B. Swan
Al Alquist at the Southern Pacific Railroad
Walter Ellsworth Bachman, Sr. (1879–1958) at the Lehigh Valley Railroad

External links
Yardmaster information from United Transportation Union

References

Rail yards